Knattspyrnufélagið Haukar is an Icelandic multi-sport club from Hafnarfjörður with divisions in Football, Handball, Basketball, Karate, Skiing & Chess.

Club history

The club was founded on 12 April 1931, when 13 young boys got together in a local KFUM (Icelandic YMCA) house to form a new athletic club in the town. At the club's 3rd meeting, they decided that it would be named Knattspyrnufélagið Haukar.

Facilities

Haukar's home is Ásvellir which has a purpose built arena for Handball and Basketball as well as a grass and artificial turf field
for the Football team.

On 8 October 2009, it was announced that Haukar would play home games in the Pepsi-Deildin at Valur's Vodafonevöllurinn for the next 3 seasons, to be reviewed at the end of each season.

At the same time it was announced that a stand with seating for 500 would be built at Haukar's artificial turf to meet with the regulations of the female Pepsi-Deildin.

Basketball

Men's basketball

The Haukar men's basketball team have won one Icelandic championships. They currently play in Úrvalsdeild karla.

Women's basketball

The Haukar's women's basketball team have won 4 national championships, the last coming in 2018. They currently play in Úrvalsdeild kvenna.

Football

Men's football

In 2010, Haukar were promoted to the Úrvalsdeild karla for the first time in 31 years. They finished second to last in the league during the 2010 season and were relegated back to 1. deild karla.

Women's football

The Haukar's women's football team currently plays in the 1. deild kvenna, the second-tier women's football league in Iceland, after being relegated from Úrvalsdeild kvenna in 2017.

Handball

Rugby

References

External links
 Official homepage(Icelandic)

 
Football clubs in Iceland
Association football clubs established in 1931
1931 establishments in Iceland
Sport in Hafnarfjörður
Sports clubs founded by the YMCA